The British RML 8-inch 9-ton guns Mark I – Mark III were medium rifled muzzle-loading guns used to arm smaller ironclad warships and coast defence batteries in the later 19th century.

Design 
In common with other Royal Ordnance RML designs of the 1860s, Mark I used the strong but expensive Armstrong system of a steel tube surrounded by a complex system of multiple wrought-iron coils, which was progressively simplified in Marks II and III to reduce costs : Mark III consisted only of A tube, B tube, breech coil and cascabel screw.

Rifling was of the "Woolwich" pattern of a small number of broad shallow grooves: 4 grooves with twist increasing from 0 to 1 turn in 40 calibres (i.e. in 320 inches) at the muzzle.

Ammunition 
The ammunition was mainly studded, with the studs engaging in the Woolwich rifling grooves. However, a studless pointed common shell with automatic gas-check also became available later in the gun's life.

See also 
 List of naval guns

Surviving examples

Notes and references

Bibliography 
 Text Book of Gunnery, 1887. LONDON : PRINTED FOR HIS MAJESTY'S STATIONERY OFFICE, BY HARRISON AND SONS, ST. MARTIN'S LANE 
 Sir Thomas Brassey, The British Navy, Volume II. London: Longmans, Green and Co. 1882

External links 

Naval guns of the United Kingdom
203 mm artillery
Victorian-era weapons of the United Kingdom